The A Bailar Tour was the first headlining concert tour by Argentine recording artist Lali in support of her debut studio album, A Bailar (2014). The tour began on April 19, 2014, in Buenos Aires and concluded in on April 25, 2016, Tel Aviv. It was the highest-grossing tour of 2015 in Argentina.

Background
On September 2, 2013, Espósito had launched her solo career in an show at La Trastienda. The same night, she performed "A Bailar", "Asesina" and "Del Otro Lado". On March 15, 2014, a few days before the album release, Espósito performed "A Bailar" at the Caserta Festival in Italy.

The first leg of the tour included shows in Argentina, Uruguay, Spain and Italy. On November 27, Espósito performed as the opening act for a Ricky Martin's show at Ciudad del Rock, Buenos Aires in front of more than eighty thousand people. The five shows at the Opera Allianz Theater grossed AR$ 2,500,000. The second leg of the tour consisted in five summer shows and performances in festivals.

The dates for the third leg of the tour were announced on March 4, 2015, via Espósito's official Twitter account. Most of the dates included cities that had been previously visited in the first leg. Because of the high ticket demand for the shows in Rosario and Salta, a second date in each city was added.

The fourth and last leg of the tour included dates in Argentina, Uruguay, Chile and Israel. On October 3, 2015, Espósito performed as the opening act for Katy Perry's The Prismatic World Tour show at Hipódromo de Palermo in Buenos Aires. This leg of the tour included two sold out dates at the Luna Park Arena in Buenos Aires and two at the Menora Mivtachim Arena in Tel Aviv.

Set lists

Shows

Cancelled and rescheduled shows

Notes

Live broadcasts

References

Lali Espósito concert tours
2014 concert tours
2015 concert tours
2016 concert tours